Kalo Nero may refer to:
 Kalo Nero, a village and a local district in Avlona, Messenia, Peloponnese
 Kalo Nero, a village in Makrys Gialos, Lasithi, Crete
 Kalo Nero, a village in Nikaia, Larissa, Thessaly